The thirteenth season of American Dad! aired on TBS from January 25, 2016 to June 27, 2016.

On November 18, 2014, TBS renewed the series for a 22-episode thirteenth season. Additionally, in August 2015, TBS would announce that the network had ordered a fourteenth and fifteenth season, both consisting of 22 episodes.

Because of Mike Barker's departure from the show, his characters Terry Bates and John Sanders were written out of the series in "Anchorfran" (Terry left Greg so he can follow the band 311) and "Widow's Pique" (Sanders died on a body recovery mission), respectively. The season also included the two-hundredth episode, "The Two Hundred".

Guest stars for the season include James Adomian, Joe Buck, Sam Elliott, Bruce Greenwood, Lance Henriksen, Oliver Platt, Patton Oswalt, Flea, Tyrese Gibson, Eric André, Laird Hamilton, Paul Dooley, James Hetfield, Missy Elliott, Patricia Clarkson, Keegan-Michael Key, Jordan Peele, Jason Mantzoukas, Joan Cusack, John O'Hurley, Ashley Tisdale, George Takei, Naya Rivera, and Billy Bob Thornton.


Episode list

References

2016 American television seasons
American Dad! (season 13) episodes